The Broadway Tower, located in the Enid Downtown Historic District in Enid, Oklahoma, was constructed in 1931 by McMillen and Shelton Construction Company.  The Broadway Development Company hired George Ernst von Blumenauer of Enid, and the Oklahoma City firm Layton, Hicks, and Forsythe to design the building, in the Art Deco style.

In 1943, Mr. Garrison Munger, Sr. purchased the building. It remained in his family's ownership until 1981. It is currently owned by Tower Investment Company and Oklahoma partnership. The building is the tallest in Enid at 14 stories tall. It has been listed on the National Register of Historic Places since 1985.

After a fire destroyed the original Garfield County Courthouse, the Broadway Tower became a temporary courthouse location from 1932 to 1936.

In 2015 the building was closed to the public when portions of the brick exterior separated from the building. It was declared dilapidated by the City of Enid in 2022.

Gallery

References

Buildings and structures in Enid, Oklahoma
Commercial buildings on the National Register of Historic Places in Oklahoma
Tourist attractions in Enid, Oklahoma
Commercial buildings completed in 1931
Art Deco architecture in Oklahoma
National Register of Historic Places in Garfield County, Oklahoma